NCAA Season 77 is the 2001–02 season of the National Collegiate Athletic Association (Philippines), which was hosted by Philippine Christian University.

It was last broadcast by PTV Produced by Silverstar Sports.

Basketball

Elimination round

Men's playoffs

See also
 UAAP Season 64

2001 in multi-sport events
77
2002 in multi-sport events
2001 in Philippine sport
2002 in Philippine sport